Cleopatra is an unincorporated community in Mercer County, in the U.S. state of Missouri.

History
Cleopatra was originally called Somerset, and under the latter name was platted in 1856.  A post office called Cleopatra was established in 1861, and remained in operation until 1905.

References

Unincorporated communities in Mercer County, Missouri
Unincorporated communities in Missouri